Dulong may refer to:
 Dulong people or Derung people, a Chinese ethnic group
 Dulong language, a Tibeto-Burman language in China
 Dulong, Queensland a locality in the Sunshine Coast Region, Australia
 Dulong River in the Southeast of Tibet

People with the surname
 Pierre Louis Dulong (1785–1838)

See also
 The Dulong–Petit law